Marsa Ben M'Hidi is a town and commune in Tlemcen Province in northwestern Algeria, located next to the border with Morocco.

References

Communes of Tlemcen Province
Algeria
Cities in Algeria